Sarathi, Saarathi or Sarathy may refer to:

People with the name 
 Sarathi (comedian) (1942–2022), Indian actor and producer
 Sarathi Baba, self-proclaimed guru
 Brinda Sarathy, film director
 M. P. Sarathy, politician from Tamil Nadu
 M.S. Partha Sarathi (born 1961), politician from Andhra Pradesh
 Sanjana Sarathy, actress
 Sarathy Korwar , musician
 Sunitha Sarathy, vocalist

Other uses 
 Sarathi (name of Krishna)
 Saarathi, a 2011 film
 Sarathi, Karnataka, a settlement in Davanagere district, Karnataka
 Sarathi Studios, a film studio in Hyderabad
 Sarathi Socio Cultural Trust, an NGO in Bangalore